Thomas, Tom, or Tommy Sheehan or Sheahan may refer to:

Sheahan
 Tom Sheahan (born 1968), Irish politician

Sheehan
 Thomas Sheehan (philosopher) (born 1941), American academic who has written on Heidegger and Roman Catholicism
 Tom Sheehan (1894–1982), Major League Baseball pitcher and manager
 Tom Sheehan (politician) (1891–1955), Australian politician
 Tommy Sheehan (baseball) (1877–1959), Major League Baseball third baseman
 Tommy Sheehan (Gaelic footballer) (born 1966), Irish Gaelic footballer
 Tommy Sheehan (Survivor contestant) (born 1992), Survivor: Island of the Idols winner